Grayson County Courthouse may refer to:

Grayson County Courthouse (Kentucky), Leitchfield, Kentucky
Grayson County Courthouse (Texas), Sherman, Texas
Grayson County Courthouse (Virginia), Independence, Virginia